Triplophysa aluensis is a species of stone loach in the genus Triplophysa. It is endemic to China. It grows to  SL.

References

aluensis
Freshwater fish of China
Endemic fauna of China
Taxa named by Li Wie-Xian
Taxa named by Zhu Zhi-Gang
Fish described in 2000